Ernest Renan was an armored cruiser built for the French Navy in the first decade of the 20th century. At the outbreak of World War I in August 1914, she participated in the hunt for the German battlecruiser  and then joined the blockade of the Austro-Hungarian Navy in the Adriatic. She took part in the Battle of Antivari later in August, and the seizure of Corfu in January 1916, but saw no further action during the war. After the war, the British and French intervened in the Russian Civil War; this included a major naval deployment to the Black Sea, which included Ernest Renan. She served as a training ship in the late 1920s before she was sunk as a target ship in the 1930s.

Design and description

Her crew numbered either 750 or 824 officers and enlisted men.

The ship had three propeller shafts, each powered by a single vertical triple-expansion steam engine. They were rated at a total of  using steam provided by 42 Niclausse boilers. The boilers were grouped into two sets of boiler rooms that were separated by the amidships gun turrets and their magazines. They exhausted into six funnels, which were grouped in two widely spaced sets of three.

Ernest Renans main armament consisted of four 50-caliber Canon de 194 mm Modèle 1902 guns mounted in twin gun turrets fore and aft. Her secondary armament was twelve 45-caliber Canon de 164 mm Modèle 1893-96 guns. Eight of these were in single turrets on the forecastle deck and the other four were in casemates. For anti-torpedo boat defence she carried sixteen  guns and eight  Hotchkiss guns. She was also armed with two submerged  torpedo tubes. During World War I, some of her lighter guns were replaced by anti-aircraft guns, but details are lacking.

The armor thinned to  forward of the foremast and  aft of the mainmast. It did not extend all the way to the stern and terminated in a  bulkhead. A watertight internal cofferdam, filled with cellulose, ran the length of the ship between the upper and main decks.

The conning tower was 203 mm thick.

Construction and career
Ernest Renan, named after the philosopher and philologist Ernest Renan, was built at the Chantiers de Penhoët shipyard in Saint-Nazaire. Her keel was laid down on 21 October 1903 and she was launched on 9 April 1906. Fitting-out work was completed by early 1909, and she was commissioned into the French Navy in February. After entering service, Ernest Renan was assigned to the cruiser squadron of the Mediterranean Fleet, based in Toulon. In April 1912, she was assigned to the 1st Light Squadron, along with the two s.

World War I

These ships, along with a flotilla of twelve destroyers, was to steam to Philippeville on 4 August, but the German ships had bombarded the port the previous day. This attack, coupled with reports that suggested the Germans would try to break out of the Mediterranean into the Atlantic, prompted the French high command to send Ernest Renan and the First Light Division further west, to Algiers in an attempt to block the Germans.

After the German ships escaped to Constantinople, rather than attack the French troop transports from North Africa as had been expected, the French turned to address the next naval threat: the Austro-Hungarian Navy in the Adriatic Sea. Ernest Renan joined the rest of the French fleet in its blockade of the Adriatic Sea. The fleet, commanded by Admiral Augustin Boué de Lapeyrère, had assembled by the night of 15 August; the following morning, it conducted a sweep into the Adriatic and encountered the Austro-Hungarian cruiser . In the ensuing Battle of Antivari, Zenta was sunk, with no losses on the French side. The French fleet then withdrew due to the threat of Austro-Hungarian U-boats in the area.

On 8 January 1916, Ernest Renan, Edgar Quinet,  and  embarked a contingent of Chasseurs Alpins (mountain troops) to seize the Greek island of Corfu. The cruisers sent the troops ashore on the night of 10 January; the Greek officials on the island protested the move but offered no resistance. On 22 December, Ernest Renan collided with an Italian steamer, several passengers of which drowned in the accident. Ernest Renan spent the rest of the war in the Mediterranean and did not see further action.

Postwar
Shortly after the end of the war, British and French warships began to operate in the Black Sea in what became a large-scale intervention in the Russian Civil War against the Bolsheviks. Ernest Renan was among the first Allied warships to enter the area; she arrived in Novorossiysk with the British light cruiser  and two torpedo boats on 23 November 1918. On 18 March 1921, the leadership of the Democratic Republic of Georgia was evacuated on board Ernest Renan to France after the Red Army invasion of Georgia.

After returning to France, the ship's mainmast was removed to allow her to tow a balloon and anti-aircraft guns were installed on the roofs of the after 164 mm gun turrets. Ernest Renan finished her active career as a gunnery training ship from 1927 to 1929, after which she was stricken from the naval register. During her tenure in the gunnery school, she was commanded by Émile Muselier, who went on to serve as the commander of the Free French Naval Forces during World War II. In 1931, the old cruiser was expended as a target ship for aircraft and naval gunners.

Notes

References

Bibliography
 
 
 
 

 
 
 

 
 
 
 
 

Cruisers of the French Navy
Ships built in France
1906 ships
World War I cruisers of France
Ships sunk as targets
Maritime incidents in 1931